Jalal Barzanji (born 1953 in Arbil northern of Iraq) is a contemporary Kurdish poet and writer.

He has served on the board of Writers' Union and was executive director of Ministry of Culture in Iraqi Kurdistan. He left Iraqi-Kurdistan in 1996 due to an ongoing civil war in Kurdistan. He has been living in Canada since 1998 after escaping Iraq where he was tortured and imprisoned because of his writings from 1986 to 1989. He was appointed as the Edmonton-PEN Canada Writer-in-Exile for the period 2007–2008. He helped establish the Canadian Kurdish Friendship Association and the Edmonton Immigrant Support Network Society. He has published six books of poetry and was the 2004 recipient of aRISE award. He is due to publish a memoir sometime in October 2011. In the memoir Barzanji writes about his imprisonment in 1986–1989, during which time he endured torture under Saddam Hussein’s regime because of his literary and journalistic achievements—writing that openly explores themes of peace, democracy, and freedom. For those three years, Barzanji wrote only on scrap paper, smuggled into his cell in Iraq. He wrote his memoir during his time as the first Writer in Exile of PEN Canada.

Life and career

Early life
Born in a small Kurdish village, he grew up the second oldest brother in his family of 7 (now 6, as his a younger brother passed in 1983 at a young age) siblings. Jalal was different from his other siblings in that most of his time was spent reading books, and writing. As a child his mother would lovingly complain over his fascination with books. Although he played sports such as soccer, his truest love was of literature. An honors student all through school, and an incredibly sociable person, Jalal chose to become a teacher, where his love of literature would extend into his job. Soon Jalal became a magazine editor, around the same time he met his wife, also a poet, and would be imprisoned for many of the articles and poems he wrote. Upon being released from the harsh prison environment which consisted of torture, he fled to Turkey where his family soon met him and they resided for 2 years before being accepted as immigrants to Canada.

Works 

1979: The Dawning of the Evening Snow, Collection of Poems
1985: Unwarm, Rashid Publishing, Baghdad
1996: War, Gew Books, Iraqi Kurdistan
2002: Holy Rain, Kurdish Ministry of Culture Publishing
2006: Memory of a Person Under the Wind, Bedrxan Publishers, Iraqi Kurdistan
2007: On Going back to Birth Place, Mnara Publishers, Iraqi Kurdistan

References

1956 births
21st-century Canadian poets
Kurdish poets
Living people
Canadian male poets
21st-century Canadian male writers